Apocalypse is the Mahavishnu Orchestra's fourth album and third studio album, released in 1974.

It is performed by the second line-up of the Mahavishnu Orchestra and the London Symphony Orchestra. It was produced by George Martin, who regarded it as "one of the best records [he had] ever made".

The back cover features a poem by Sri Chinmoy as well as a group photo of those who created the album.

Track listing
All music composed by John McLaughlin; Lyrics to "Smile of the Beyond" composed by "Mahalakshmi" Eve McLaughlin

Personnel 
John McLaughlin – guitars, vocal composer
Gayle Moran – keyboards, vocals
Jean-Luc Ponty – electric violin, electric baritone violin
Ralphe Armstrong – bass guitar, vocals
Narada Michael Walden – drums, percussion, vocals

with

Michael Tilson Thomas – conductor, piano
Michael Gibbs – orchestration
Marsha Westbrook – viola
George Martin – producer
Carol Shive – violin, vocals
Philip Hirschi – cello, vocals
Geoff Emerick – engineer

Charts

References

Bibliography
 

Albums produced by George Martin
Mahavishnu Orchestra albums
1974 albums
Columbia Records albums